The String Sonata No. 1, commonly referred to by its original Italian name Sonata per archi, is a composition for string orchestra by German composer Hans Werner Henze. It was composed between 1957 and 1958.

Composition 

The sonata was commissioned by Paul Sacher for his own orchestra, the Collegium Musicum Zürich, together with his Double Concerto for Oboe, Harp and Strings, and was written between 1957 and early 1958. According to Henze, it was influenced by an earlier idea of Heinz von Cramer, the librettist of Henze's König Hirsch, for a ballet about the Embarquement pour Cythère.  It was premiered by Paul Sacher in Zurich on March 21, 1958. It was dedicated to Paul Sacher and his wife, Maya Sacher and was later published by B. Schotts' Sohne.

Structure 

The sonata is in two movements and has a total duration of 15 minutes. The movement list is as follows:

 1. Allegro
 2. 32 Variations
 Thema. Mosso
 Variation I. Adagio
 Variation II. Più mosso
 Variation III. Lo stesso tempo
 Variation IV. Molto calmo
 Variation V. Lo stesso tempo, con tenerezza
 Variation VI. Assai mosso, con vigore
 Variation VII. Meno mosso, leggiero
 Variation VIII. Ancora meno
 Variation IX. Con moto
 Variation X. Più mosso
 Variation XI. Molto più mosso, appassionato
 Variation XII. Mesto
 Variation XIII. Un poco più mosso
 Variation XIV. Lo stesso tempo (estremamente piano)
 Variation XV. Ancora calmo
 Variation XVI. Con fuoco
 Variation XVII. Veloce
 Variation XVIII. Lo stesso tempo
 Variation XIX. Lo stesso tempo
 Variation XX. Ritardando
 Variation XXI. Di nuovo assai mosso
 Variation XXII. Di più
 Variation XXIII. Leggiero
 Variation XXIV. Meno mosso
 Variation XXV. Furioso
 Variation XXVI. Molto più lento
 Variation XXVII. Molto meno mosso ancora
 Variation XXVIII. Subito più mosso
 Variation XXIX. Sostenuto
 Variation XXX. Grave (Lamentandosi)
 Variation XXXI. ♩. = 76
 Variation XXXII. ♩ = 60

Its structure is nothing like a traditional sonata and displays the composer's distinctive serialist style. The first movement consists of a five-minute Stravinskian toccata, with plenty neo-classical features. It starts in E minor, but modulates in minor-third oscillations. The second movement is presumably influenced by Beethoven and consists of a set of attacca variations which are very difficult to distinguish by ear. It is scored for eight first violins, six second violins, four violas , four celli and two double basses.

Notable recordings 

 Paul Sacher conducted the Collegium Musicum Zürich in August 1967. The recording was released by Deutsche Grammophon both in LP and CD format.

References 

Compositions for string orchestra
Compositions by Hans Werner Henze
1958 compositions
Serial compositions